Leclerc, Le Clerc and LeClerc are typical French or Francophone surnames which can refer to:

 Daniel Le Clerc (1652–1728), Swiss medical writer
 Charles Leclerc (1772–1802), French general and brother-in-law of Napoleon Bonaparte
 Charles Leclerc (born 1997), Monégasque Formula One driver.
 Charles Leclerc de Landremont (1739–1818), French general
 Édouard Leclerc (1926–2012),  the founder of the French supermarket chain E.Leclerc
 Félix Leclerc (1914–1988), Québécois folk singer
 François Leclerc (~1554), French pirate
 Fud Leclerc (1924–2010), Belgian singer
 Georges-Louis Leclerc, Comte de Buffon (1707–1788), French scientist
 Ginette Leclerc (1912–1992), French film actress
 H. Leclerc – French biochemist found the enterobacterium Leclercia adecarboxylata (1962)
 Jean Leclerc (disambiguation), several people
 Jean Théophile Victor Leclerc (1771–1796), also known as Jean-Theophilus Leclerc, radical French revolutionist and newspaperman
 José Leclerc (born 1993), Dominican baseball player
 Joseph-Victor Leclerc (1789–1865), French scholar and linguist
 Kim Leclerc (born 1985), Canadian politician
 Marc-Andre Leclerc (1992-2018), Canadian rock climber
 Mike Leclerc (born 1976), Canadian ice hockey player
 Philippe Leclerc de Hauteclocque (1902–1947), French general in World War II
 Monsieur Roger LeClerc, incompetent Resistance activist in the farce 'Allo 'Allo!
 Monsieur Ernest LeClerc, his brother and successor
 Robin Leclerc (born 1952), French former footballer
Roger LeClerc (American football)
 Sébastien Leclerc  (1637–1714) French artist and engraver, or his son, Sébastien Leclerc "the Younger" (1676–1763), a French painter.
 Sébastien Leclerc (politician) (born 1970), French politician

See also 
 Clerc (surname)
 LeClair (surname)
 Leclercq (similar spelling)

 Clerck (surname)
 De Clerck (surname)

Surnames
Occupational surnames
French-language surnames